The following is a discography for the American singer and songwriter Raven-Symoné. In 1993 she released her debut album Here's to New Dreams, which was preceded by her debut single "That's What Little Girls Are Made Of", charted at No. 68 on the US Billboard Hot 100. In 1996, Raven-Symoné signed a distribution deal with Crash Records for her second album Undeniable, which was released in May 1999. From 2003 to 2006 she released four soundtracks: The Cheetah Girls (2003) and The Cheetah Girls 2 (2006) from Disney Channel Original Movies and That's So Raven and That's So Raven Too! from Disney Channel Original Series. 

Raven-Symoné signed a two-album record deal with Disney-owned label Hollywood Records and her third album This Is My Time was released on September 21, 2004, and charted at No. 51 on the Billboard 200. The album produced singles "Grazing in the Grass" and "Backflip". Symoné released her fourth studio album Raven-Symoné on April 29, 2008. The album charted at No. 159 on the Billboard 200, and was preceded by the lead single, a cover of Frankie Smith's "Double Dutch Bus", on July 28, 2008. 

Raven-Symoné began releasing music under her mononym Raven with the release of her EP 33000 on December 10, 2019.

Albums

Studio albums

Soundtrack albums

Compilations

Extended plays

Singles

As main artist

As featured artist

Promotional singles

Other appearances

Music videos

Notes
Notes
A  "Step Up" did not enter the Billboard Hot 100 but peaked at number 6 on the Bubbling Under Hot 100 Singles chart.
B  "Amigas Cheetahs" did not enter the Billboard Hot 100 but peaked at number 10 on the Bubbling Under Hot 100 Singles chart.

References

Rhythm and blues discographies
Discographies of American artists
Pop music discographies